Adam of Rottweil, (German: Adam von Rottweil; Italian: Adamo de Rodvila (Rottweil 14?? - L'Aquila 1???) was a fifteenth century scholar and printer. He was originally a pupil and collaborator of Johann Gutenberg. In 1477 Adam published in Venice one of the first German-Italian dictionaries. This work was clearer and better organized compared with the first German-Venetian dictionary published in 1424 by Georg von Nürnberg. He was working to recreate the alphabet of Roman inscriptions, something that he completed circa 1460. In 1481 Adam obtained permission to establish a printing press in L'Aquila.

Works

, Venice 1477

Sources

15th-century German people
People from Rottweil
Year of birth unknown
Year of death unknown